In computing, label is a command included with some operating systems (e.g., DOS, IBM OS/2, Microsoft Windows and ReactOS). It is used to create, change, or delete a volume label on a logical drive, such as a hard disk partition or a floppy disk. Used without parameters, label changes the current volume label or deletes the existing label.

History

The command was originally designed to label floppy disks as a reminder of which one is in the machine. However, it can also be applied to other types of drive such as mapped drives.

It is available in MS-DOS versions 3.1 and later and IBM PC DOS releases 3 and later.
It is an external command. MS-DOS 4.0x and earlier used label.com as the external file. MS-DOS 5.0 and Windows use label.exe as the external file. DR DOS 6.0 includes an implementation of the  command. The FreeDOS version was developed by Joe Cosentino and is licensed under the GPL.

In modern versions of Microsoft Windows, changing the disk label requires elevated permissions. The Windows dir command displays the volume label and serial number (if it has one) as part of the directory listing.

In Unix and other Unix-like operating systems, the name of the equivalent command differs from file system to file system. For instance, the command e2label can be used for ext2 partitions.

Syntax
 LABEL [drive:][label]
 LABEL [/MP] [volume] [label]

Arguments:
drive: This command-line argument specifies the drive letter of a drive.
label Specifies the label of the volume.
volume Specifies the drive letter (followed by a colon), mount point, or volume name.

Flags:
/MP Specifies that the volume should be treated as a mount point or volume name.

Note: If volume name is specified, the /MP flag is unnecessary.

Example for the command.
C:\Users\root>label D: Backup

Supported file systems
FAT12
FAT16
FAT32
exFAT
NTFS

Limitations

FAT volume labels
FAT volumes have the following limitations:
 Volume labels can contain as many as 11 character bytes and can include spaces, but no tabs. The characters are in the OEM code page of the system that created the label.
 Volume labels cannot contain the following characters: ? / \ | . , ; : + = [ ] < > " 
 Volume labels are stored as upper-case regardless of whether they contain lower-case letters.

NTFS volume labels
NTFS volume labels can contain as many as 32 Unicode characters.

See also
Vol (command) — Displays the disk volume label and serial number.
List of DOS commands

References

Further reading

External links

label | Microsoft Docs

External DOS commands
OS/2 commands
ReactOS commands
Windows commands
Microcomputer software
Windows administration